Clinical Chemistry and Laboratory Medicine is a monthly peer-reviewed scientific journal that is published by De Gruyter.

History 
The journal was established in 1963 as Clinical chemistry/Klinische Chemie. In 1991 it was renamed to European Journal of Clinical Chemistry and Clinical Biochemistry. In 1998 it obtained its present name.

Scope 
The journal covers developments in fundamental and applied research into science related to clinical laboratories. It covers areas such as clinical biochemistry, molecular medicine, hematology, immunology, microbiology, virology, drug measurement, genetic epidemiology, evaluation of diagnostic markers, new reagents and systems, reference materials, and reference values. It also publishes recommendations and news from the International Federation of Clinical Chemistry and Laboratory Medicine and the European Federation of Clinical Chemistry and Laboratory Medicine.

Abstracting and indexing 
The journal is abstracted and indexed in:

According to the Journal Citation Reports, the journal has a 2017 impact factor of 3.556.

Associated organizations 
Clinical Chemistry and Laboratory Medicine is the official journal of the European Federation of Clinical Chemistry and Laboratory Medicine (EFLM). It is also the official journal of the Association of Clinical Biochemists in Ireland, the Belgian Society of Clinical Chemistry, the German United Society of Clinical Chemistry and Laboratory Medicine, the Greek Society of Clinical Chemistry-Clinical Biochemistry, the Italian Society of Clinical Biochemistry and Clinical Molecular Biology, the Slovenian Association for Clinical Chemistry, and the Spanish Society for Clinical Biochemistry and Molecular Pathology.

References

Citations

Sources

External links 
 

Laboratory medicine journals
Medicinal chemistry journals
Publications established in 1963
De Gruyter academic journals
Monthly journals
English-language journals